Patrick Trezise (born 25 March 1982, in Durban) is a South African judoka, who played for the middleweight category. He is also a four-time medalist for his division at the African Judo Championships.

Trezise represented South Africa at the 2008 Summer Olympics, where he competed for the men's middleweight class (90 kg). He lost his first preliminary match by an ippon and a kata guruma (shoulder wheel) to Russia's Ivan Pershin. Because his opponent advanced further into the semi-finals, Trezise offered another shot for the bronze medal by entering the repechage rounds. He was defeated in his first match by Argentina's Diego Rosati, who successfully scored an ippon and a seoi-nage (shoulder throw), at fifty-three seconds.
Patrick is now the coach of Ippon Judo club in Pretoria which he started.

References

External links

NBC 2008 Olympics profile

South African male judoka
Living people
Olympic judoka of South Africa
Judoka at the 2008 Summer Olympics
Sportspeople from Durban
1982 births